Gitanos Football Club was an English association football club and one of the first members of the Football Association.

History

Reportedly founded in 1864, their name, Spanish for "gypsies", reflected that they had no home ground.  They appear to have mostly played away matches only until using Prince's Cricket Ground in Chelsea by 1875.

The team primarily consisted of Old Etonians and Old Carthusians (men who had attended Eton or Charterhouse).

The earliest known report of the club playing an external fixture dates from 1867.  As a "select" club, in an era before players concentrated their efforts on one club, the Gitanos enjoyed the ad hoc services of a number of prominent players of the day, such as Arthur Kinnaird, Edgar Lubbock, Albert Thompson, George Holden of the Clapham Rovers, and J.H. Giffard of the Civil Service. There was a particular overlap with the Wanderers as old boys of Eton and Charterhouse were eligible for both sides.

The club competed in the FA Cup in 1873, losing to Uxbridge F.C. in the first round.  Given the overlap of membership with the Wanderers, most players preferred to play for the more successful club in Cup competition, and the Gitanos' one FA Cup tie saw only eight players turn up.  Those who did play were not the first choice players; of the line-up that faced the Royal Engineers that season, only four played against Uxbridge, and two other players played instead for the Wanderers in the competition.  The club did not enter the FA Cup again.   

The club's final recorded match was in the 1876-77 season, and it only arranged one match for 1877-78, which does not seem to have taken place.  Given the competition for loyalty from the Old Etonians' and Old Carthusians' sides, as well as the Wanderers' ongoing success, the club ceased to exist.

Records
Only FA Cup performance: 1st Round – 1873–74

Colours

The club wore scarlet, violet, and white, in broad stripes.

Legacy
In 1891, an article in Fores's Sporting Notes reviewed a copy of the 1874 Football Annual and commented on how  clubs had come and gone over time.  The 1874 annual listed less than 200 football clubs in all of England, and by 1891 the author asked "what has become of such old giants as the Gitanos, Harrow Chequers, Pilgrims, and Woodford Wells."

See also

Crusaders, another club of the time made up of old boys from two public schools (Eton and Westminster School)

References

Defunct football clubs in England
Defunct football clubs in London
Association football clubs disestablished in the 19th century
Association football clubs established in 1864